Furfura Fatehia Senior Madrasah is a madrasah in Furfura Sharif, Hooghly district, West Bengal, India. It was founded in 1903 by the inaugural Pir of Furfura, Mohammad Abu Bakr Siddique.

Alumni
Abbas Siddiqui, politician and Islamic scholar

References

External links

Madrasas in West Bengal
Schools in Hooghly district
1903 establishments in British India
Educational institutions established in 1903